Makyneia is a seaside village and a community in Nafpaktia, Aetolia-Acarnania, Greece.

According to the 2011 census, the village had 377 inhabitants, and the community, which also includes the villages Agrapidokampos, Agios Polykarpos and Riza, 563 inhabitants.

Makyneia is situated on the northeast coast of the Gulf of Patras, 4.5 km west of Antirrio. The Greek National Road 5 (Patras-Antirrio-Agrinio-Ioannina), which has recently been bypassed by the Motorway 5 (also the E55), passes through the village.

History

Settlement at Makyneia, under various names, including the ancient town of Macynia, dates back to the ancient times, may be as early as the Homeric age. It was a town of western Locris and later Aetolia. Until 1980, the settlement was known as Kato Mammako.

Historical population

References

External links
Makyneia, I Aitolia gi apokalyptetai! (Η Αιτωλία γη αποκαλύπτεται!) - Touristic guide, p. 95-96
Ancient Theater of Makyneia - diazoma.gr 
Important artifacts of Makyneia - Archaiologia 

Populated places in Aetolia-Acarnania
Nafpaktia
Ancient Greek cities
Ancient Aetolia